Chest infection may refer to:

Upper respiratory tract infection
Lower respiratory tract infection
Bronchitis
Pneumonia
Pleurisy
Tuberculosis